Ryan Santoso (born August 26, 1995) is an American football placekicker who is a free agent. He played college football at Minnesota.

College career

Recruiting profile
Santoso was the seventh-ranked kicker and a two-star recruit out of Pace High School in Pace, Florida. He signed a letter of intent to play college football at the University of Minnesota on December 25, 2012.

Minnesota
Santoso redshirted during the 2013 season.

He became Minnesota's kicker in 2014 and had a poor 12-of-18 (66.7%) showing on field goal attempts but went 45-of-46 (97.8%) on extra point tries. The high point of his season was 52-yard field goal to beat Purdue.

In 2015, Santoso's field goal numbers improved drastically, he went 17-of-21 (80.9) on field goal attempts, including a game-winning field goal in overtime against Colorado State. He also was a perfect 32-of-32 on extra point tries.

Prior to the 2016 season, the Gophers announced that Santoso would change positions to punter.

In 2016, Santoso punted 77 times for 3,151 yards (40.9 yards/punt). In 2017, he punted 66 times for 2,838 yards (43.0 yards/punt)

Professional career

Detroit Lions
On April 28, 2018, Santoso signed with the Detroit Lions as an undrafted free agent. He was waived on September 1, 2018. He signed a reserve/future contract with the Lions on January 3, 2019. He was waived during final roster cuts on August 30, 2019.

Montreal Alouettes
The Montreal Alouettes of the CFL signed Santoso to their practice roster on September 24, 2019. He was released on October 15, 2019.

Tennessee Titans
Santoso was signed back into the NFL by the Tennessee Titans on November 27, 2019. He was waived on December 17, 2019.

Montreal Alouettes (second stint)
On February 13, 2020, Santoso was re-signed by the Montreal Alouettes. He was released on August 18, 2020, after the 2020 CFL season was cancelled.

New York Giants
On September 6, 2020, Santoso was signed to the New York Giants practice squad. He was promoted to the active roster on November 17, 2020. He was waived on December 1, 2020, and re-signed to the practice squad two days later. He was elevated to the active roster on January 2, 2021, for the team's week 17 game against the Dallas Cowboys, and reverted to the practice squad after the game. On January 26, 2021, Santoso signed a reserves/futures contract with the Giants.

Carolina Panthers 
On August 26, 2021, Santoso was traded to the Carolina Panthers for a conditional seventh-round pick. In Week 1 against the New York Jets, Santoso went 2-for-2 in field goals, and 1-for-2 in extra point attempts. He was waived on September 14, 2021.

Tennessee Titans (second stint)
The Tennessee Titans signed Santoso to their practice squad on September 17, 2021. He was released from the practice squad on September 20, 2021.

Detroit Lions (second stint)
On September 22, 2021, Santoso signed with the Detroit Lions' practice squad. Santoso was promoted to the active roster three days later to replace kicker Austin Seibert, who ended up on the COVID-19 reserve list earlier in the week. In Week 10 against the Pittsburgh Steelers, Santoso missed an extra point, and a game winning field goal in overtime which would've given the Lions their first win of the season, however the game resulted in a tie in the end. He was released on November 16, 2021.

Los Angeles Rams
On December 18, 2021, Santoso was signed to the Los Angeles Rams practice squad. Santoso became a Super Bowl champion when the Rams defeated the Cincinnati Bengals in Super Bowl LVI.

Jacksonville Jaguars
On March 21, 2022, Santoso signed with the Jacksonville Jaguars. On August 23, 2022, he was waived.

New York Giants (second stint) 
On August 26, 2022, Santoso signed again with the New York Giants. He was waived on August 29, 2022.

References

External links
Minnesota Golden Gophers bio

1995 births
Living people
American sportspeople of Indonesian descent
American football placekickers
Minnesota Golden Gophers football players
People from Santa Rosa County, Florida
Detroit Lions players
Montreal Alouettes players
Tennessee Titans players
New York Giants players
Carolina Panthers players
Los Angeles Rams players
Jacksonville Jaguars players